The 1960–61 season was the 50th season in Hajduk Split’s history and their 15th in the Yugoslav First League. Their 5th place finish in the 1959–60 season meant it was their 15th successive season playing in the Yugoslav First League.

Competitions

Overall

Yugoslav First League

Classification

Matches

Yugoslav First League

Sources: hajduk.hr

Yugoslav Cup

Sources: hajduk.hr

Mitropa Cup

Sources: hajduk.hr

Player seasonal records

Top scorers

Source: Competitive matches

See also
1960–61 Yugoslav First League
1960–61 Yugoslav Cup

External sources
 1960–61 Yugoslav First League at rsssf.com
 1960–61 Yugoslav Cup at rsssf.com
 1968–69 Mitropa Cup at rsssf.com

HNK Hajduk Split seasons
Hajduk Split